Darlington Creek is a stream in the municipality of Clarington, Regional Municipality of Durham in Ontario, Canada. It is a tributary of Lake Ontario and is located in geographic Darlington Township, after which it is named.

Course
It heads southeast, passes under the Canadian Pacific Railway main line, Ontario Highway 401, and the Canadian National Railway main lines, then turns south, and reaches its mouth at Lake Ontario. Lake Ontario flows via the Saint Lawrence River to the Gulf of Saint Lawrence.

Watershed
Groundwater discharge from the bluffs left from glacial Lake Iroquois feed the headwaters of Darlington Creek.

The watersheds of four other watercourses border the creek. The longest, Bowmanville Creek, to the east, has its headwaters in the Oak Ridges Moraine.  The other three watersheds are Tooley Creek, Farewell Creek, and Westside Creek.

References

Rivers of the Regional Municipality of Durham